Harold Keith "Johnny" Johnson (February 22, 1912 – September 24, 1983) was a United States Army general who served as Chief of Staff of the United States Army from 1964 to 1968. Regarded as a premier tactician, Johnson became skeptical that the level of resources given to the Vietnam War, much of which went into 'find, fix, and destroy the big main force units' operations, could deliver victory. Johnson came to believe that the Communist forces held a trump card, because they controlled whether there were engagements with U.S. forces, giving an option to simply avoid battle  with U.S. forces if the situation warranted it.

Early life
Harold Keith Johnson was born in Bowesmont, North Dakota, on February 22, 1912. After graduation from high school in 1929, Johnson attended the United States Military Academy, West Point, New York. On June 13, 1933, he was commissioned as a second lieutenant in the infantry. Johnson's first duty assignment was with the 3rd Infantry (Old Guard) at Fort Snelling, Minnesota.

Military career
In 1938, Johnson attended Infantry School at Fort Benning. Upon graduation, he was assigned to the 28th Infantry at Fort Niagara, New York. Requesting an overseas transfer, Johnson was reassigned to the 57th Infantry (Philippine Scouts) at Fort McKinley, Philippine Islands in 1940.

World War II
After the Battle of Bataan, Johnson became a prisoner of war (POW) of the Japanese on 9 April 1942. Participating in the Bataan Death March, Johnson was eventually imprisoned at Camp O'Donnell, Cabanatuan and Bilibid Prison. In December 1944, the Japanese attempted to transfer Johnson and 1600 other POWs out of the Philippines. On 14 December 1944, American fighter planes sank the Japanese ship Ōryoku Maru, killing over 300 of the POWs. Johnson survived and was eventually transferred to Japan. Unwilling to give up their POWs to the advancing Allies, Japan again transferred Johnson. Finally ending up in Korea, Johnson was liberated by the 7th Infantry Division on September 7, 1945.

Korean War and rise to senior command
After Johnson's return to the United States, his first assignment was with the Ground Forces School. In August 1946, he attended the Command and General Staff College at Fort Leavenworth, Kansas, where he remained as an instructor for another two years. Johnson next attended the Armed Forces Staff College in Norfolk, Virginia, in 1949. After graduation, he was assigned as commanding officer, 3rd Battalion, 7th Infantry at Fort Devens, Massachusetts.

Johnson organized the 1st Provisional Infantry Battalion at Fort Devens and, in August 1950, he was dispatched to Korea. The battalion became the 3rd Battalion, 8th Cavalry Regiment, assigned to the 1st Cavalry Division for the defense of the Pusan Perimeter. Still with the 1st Cavalry Division, Johnson was later promoted to command the 5th and the 8th Cavalry Regiments. In February 1951, he was reassigned as Assistant Chief of Staff, G3 of I Corps.

Returning to the United States, Johnson was assigned to the Office of the Chief of the Army Field Forces, Fort Monroe, Virginia. In 1952, he attended the National War College. After graduation, Johnson was assigned to the Office of the Assistant Chief of Staff, G3, where he served first, as Chief of Joint War Plans Branch, then as the Assistant to the Chief of the Plans Division, and finally as the Executive Officer of the Assistant Chief of Staff.

In January 1956, Johnson was assigned to duty as Assistant Division Commander of the 8th Infantry Division at Fort Carson, Colorado. Later in 1956, he transferred with the 8th Division to West Germany. Johnson's next assignment was as chief of staff, Seventh Army Headquarters at Stuttgart-Vaihingen. Then in April 1959, Johnson moved to Headquarters, United States Army Europe as Assistant Chief of Staff, G3. The following December, he was appointed chief of staff, Central Army Group at NATO Headquarters concerned with planning for the employment of French, German, and American troop operations in Central Europe.

Returning to the United States, Johnson was assigned as commandant, Command and General Staff College, Fort Leavenworth, Kansas. In February 1963, he became assistant deputy chief of staff for military operations (operations and plans), Department of the Army, and in July was appointed as deputy chief of staff for military operations.

Chief of Staff
On July 3, 1964, Johnson was appointed the 24th Chief of Staff of the United States Army; his reputation as an expert tactician led to him being selected over candidates with more seniority. He had told the National Guard Association that year that "military force ... should be committed with the object beyond war in mind" and "broadly speaking, the object beyond war should be the restoration of stability with the minimum of destruction, so that society and lawful government may proceed in an atmosphere of justice and order."

Vietnam War
Johnson went to Vietnam in December 1965 after the Battle of Ia Drang. He "concluded that it had not been a victory at all and that Westmoreland's big-unit strategy was misconceived". However, Johnson publicly said there was no alternative to disrupting enemy main force units in the Central Highlands as preventing them from establishing base areas in the middle of the country was essential. After talking to junior officers involved in the first major actions, Johnson concluded that enemy main force units had the ability to evade engagements, giving them the option to keep casualties below an acceptable level, but they were in fact accepting the actual kill ratios being achieved, as evidenced by them attacking United States forces. Johnson started the process to have Westmoreland replaced in Vietnam, and commissioned the PROVN Study, which noted that "aerial attacks and artillery fire, applied indiscriminately, also have exacted a toll on village allegiance." There was a deep-seated reluctance among the Joint Chiefs of Staff to interfere with the command decisions of Westmoreland, but harassing artillery fire, by United States forces at least, was greatly reduced.

As Johnson saw it, the communist units would always keep their casualties below what they considered a prohibitive level, and could not be swept away by US firepower. He did, however, acknowledge that the U.S. Commander in Vietnam, General William Westmoreland, had little choice but to engage the enemy's main formations, which had to be prevented from securing base areas where they could concentrate. Johnson was instrumental in altering the focus to a counterinsurgency approach, but was frustrated at the US Congress' refusal to provide the manpower necessary for successful pacification. In his later years Johnson said it had been obvious that US national mobilization was required to win in Vietnam, and he regretted not resigning in protest at the government asking the army to fight a war without hope of ultimate victory.

Conditions for enlisted personnel
As Chief of Staff, one of Johnson's noteworthy accomplishments was creating the office of the Sergeant Major of the Army to improve the quality of life for enlisted personnel. He selected Sergeant Major William O. Wooldridge to be the first to hold this post. Johnson also served as acting Chairman of the Joint Chiefs of Staff for a few months in 1967 during the convalescence of General Earle Wheeler. Johnson retired from active duty in July 1968. For three years, General Johnson headed the Freedoms Foundation at Valley Forge and afterwards worked as a banking executive until retiring for good.

Final years
Johnson married Dorothy Rennix in 1935. During his term as chief of staff, he had been involved in many policy debates regarding the escalation of the Vietnam War as a proponent of full military mobilization to achieve a pacification of South Vietnam. He considered resigning in protest over President Lyndon B. Johnson's decision not to mobilize the reserves, and at the end of his life expressed regret at not doing so. He was the subject of a biography, Honorable Warrior, by Lewis Sorley. Johnson died on September 24, 1983, in Washington, D.C. Johnson came to regret not opposing the escalation of the Vietnam War, lamenting that "I am now going to my grave with that lapse in moral courage on my back."

Tributes
"He had an unusual sense of loyalty to the men under him, the kind of thing ordinary soldiers notice and value when they grade an officer..." —Corporal Lester Urban

"He was the best, someone born to lead men.  I think he was always thinking about what was good for us.  Nothing ever got by him."

Decorations and awards

Dates of rank

See also

References

Further reading 
 Thunderbolt by Lewis Sorley 
 Four Stars by Mark Perry 
 Commanding Generals and Chiefs of Staff (PDF; pp. 144–145): Army biography, a publication of the United States Army Center of Military History

External links
 
 
 
 
 Harold K. Johnson Collection  US Army Heritage and Education Center, Carlisle, Pennsylvania

1912 births
1983 deaths
American torture victims
Bataan Death March prisoners
Burials at Arlington National Cemetery
Commandants of the United States Army Command and General Staff College
People from Pembina County, North Dakota
Recipients of the Distinguished Service Cross (United States)
Recipients of the Distinguished Service Medal (US Army)
Recipients of the Legion of Merit
United States Army Chiefs of Staff
United States Army Command and General Staff College alumni
United States Army generals
United States Army personnel of the Korean War
United States Army personnel of the Vietnam War
United States Army personnel of World War II
United States Military Academy alumni
World War II prisoners of war held by Japan
Recipients of the Philippine Legion of Honor
Recipients of the Order of Military Merit (Brazil)
Order of National Security Merit members
Military personnel from North Dakota